Liu Meili (born 27 June 1983) is a Chinese retired para table tennis player. She has won gold medals at every Paralympic Games from 2000 to 2012, for a total of five gold medals, two silvers, and one bronze.

She lost her lower left leg in a traffic accident when she was four years old. She began playing the sport at age 11.

References

1983 births
Living people
Paralympic table tennis players of China
Chinese female table tennis players
Table tennis players at the 2000 Summer Paralympics
Table tennis players at the 2004 Summer Paralympics
Table tennis players at the 2008 Summer Paralympics
Table tennis players at the 2012 Summer Paralympics
Medalists at the 2000 Summer Paralympics
Medalists at the 2004 Summer Paralympics
Medalists at the 2008 Summer Paralympics
Medalists at the 2012 Summer Paralympics
People from Xiao County
Paralympic gold medalists for China
Paralympic silver medalists for China
Paralympic bronze medalists for China
Paralympic medalists in table tennis
Table tennis players from Anhui
Chinese amputees
FESPIC Games competitors
21st-century Chinese women